Schaller may refer to:

 Schaller (surname)
 Sallet (Schaller), a German-style Renaissance helmet
 Schaller, Iowa, a small town in the United States
 Schaller Electronic GmbH, a German manufacturer of musical components

See also
 Justice Schaller (disambiguation)